Ilse Heller-Lazard (1884–1934) was a German painter.

Biography
Heller-Lazard was born on 3 August 1884 in Metz. Her sister was the painter Lou Albert-Lasard. She studied art and music in Strasbourg and Berlin. In 1910 she married Paul Gayer whom she divorced in 1913. In 1918 she married the Swiss sculptor . In 1919 she exhibited her work at the Kunsthaus Zürich.

She died on 10 January 1934 in Neuilly-sur-Seine, France.

Gallery

References

External links
 

1867 births
1930 deaths
20th-century German women artists
19th-century German women artists
Artists from Metz